Joe Sorren (born 1970 in Chicago) grew up in Arizona and began painting in 1991, the year he had his daughter Martha. Two years later he earned a BFA from Northern Arizona University. His artwork has appeared in various publications, including The New Yorker, Time and Rolling Stone. Warner Bros. and Atlantic Records have also used his art.

His first solo exhibit was in 1995, and had his first retrospective in 2010. A mural of his adorns an outdoor wall at Heritage Square in Flagstaff, Arizona.  The  by  painting took 9 months to complete.

References

External links
joesorren.com

1970 births
Living people
20th-century American painters
American male painters
21st-century American painters
21st-century American male artists
20th-century American male artists